The 2021 Internazionali di Tennis del Friuli Venezia Giulia was a professional tennis tournament played on clay courts. It was the 18th edition of the tournament which was part of the 2021 ATP Challenger Tour. It took place in Cordenons, Italy between 2 and 8 August 2021.

Singles main-draw entrants

Seeds

 1 Rankings are as of 26 July 2021.

Other entrants
The following players received wildcards into the singles main draw:
  Filippo Baldi
  Riccardo Bonadio
  Luca Nardi

The following player received entry into the singles main draw as a special exempt:
  Thiago Agustín Tirante

The following player received entry into the singles main draw as an alternate:
  Pavel Kotov

The following players received entry from the qualifying draw:
  Francesco Forti
  Alejandro González
  Camilo Ugo Carabelli
  Giulio Zeppieri

Champions

Singles

  Francisco Cerúndolo def.  Tomás Martín Etcheverry 6–1, 6–2.

Doubles

  Orlando Luz /  Rafael Matos def.  Sergio Galdós /  Renzo Olivo 6–4, 7–6(7–5).

References

2021 ATP Challenger Tour
2021
2021 in Italian tennis
August 2021 sports events in Italy